Brett Eldredge is the fourth studio album  by American country music artist of the same name. It was released on August 4, 2017, by Atlantic Nashville.

Content
The lead single is "Somethin' I'm Good At". The album's second single, "The Long Way", released to country radio on August 21, 2017. "Love Someone" was released June 18, 2018 as the third single.

Critical reception

Rating it 4 out of 5 stars, AllMusic reviewer Stephen Thomas Erlewine wrote that it "showcases the singer's softer side more than its predecessors". Matt Bjorke of Roughstock reviewed the album favorably, stating that Eldredge "has figured out what makes his music get even better and better: Personal vulnerability mixed with passionate performances. These are both something which Brett Eldredge is packed to the gills with." Cillea Houghton of Sounds Like Nashville was also positive, writing that "Charming, emotional and diverse are descriptions that suit Brett Eldredge, but predictable certainly isn’t with its eclectic mix of sounds, proving that Eldredge has grown as an artist."

Commercial performance
Brett Eldredge debuted at number two on the US Billboard 200 with 45,000 album-equivalent units, of which 36,000 were pure album sales. It is Eldredge's highest-charting album. The album sold a further 7,300 copies in the second week. It has sold 89,000 copies in the US as of September 2018.

Track listing
Track listing taken from Rolling Stone.

Personnel
Adapted from AllMusic

Blake Bollinger - background vocals
Dave Cohen - keyboards
Ross Copperman - acoustic guitar, electric guitar, keyboards, programming, background vocals
Kris Donegan - acoustic guitar, electric guitar
Tom Douglas - keyboards, background vocals
Dan Dugmore - lap steel guitar, pedal steel guitar
Brett Eldredge - lead vocals, background vocals
Fred Eltringham - drums
Ian Fitchuk - drums
Mark Hill - bass guitar
Brandon Hood - electric guitar
David LaBruyere - bass guitar
Jason Lehning - keyboards
Tony Lucido - bass guitar
Heather Morgan - background vocals
Jordan Reynolds - acoustic guitar, keyboards, programming, background vocals
Jeff Roach - keyboards
Matt Rogers - background vocals
Andy Skib - acoustic guitar, electric guitar, keyboards, programming, background vocals
Derek Wells - acoustic guitar, electric guitar
Micah Wilshire - background vocals

Charts

Weekly charts

Year-end charts

References

2017 albums
Albums produced by Ross Copperman 
Atlantic Records albums
Brett Eldredge albums